Jersey Couture is an American reality documentary series that premiered June 1, 2010 on Oxygen. The series follows the Scali family as they run their dress boutique, Diane & Co., located in Freehold, New Jersey and the personal lives of the owners along with the staff.

On February 7, 2012, the second season of Jersey Couture premiered.

Prom Dress Incident 

On Friday, May 20, 2011, Diane Scali, owner of the dress shop Diane & Co., made international headlines when she refused to issue a refund on a dress from a 16-year-old girl whose boyfriend and prom date died in a car accident just 2 weeks before her prom. Scali was quoted in the media as saying "It's not my fault her boyfriend died.", to boycott Diane & Co. and within 5 days had 15,000 fans worldwide supporting the teenager. Scali made headlines in newspapers and television from New York to Los Angeles and United Kingdom.

On Monday, May 23, Diane & Co. was the main subject of talk show radio angst as local and national radio programs discussed her choice to wage war on the young girl.  In the end, after nearly a week long battle, which included the cast of the show, their publicist and lawyers, Diane & Co. refunded the $1,500 dress to the girls' father.

Cast 

Diane Scali -- Diane is the owner of the dress shop, Diane & Co. Married to Sal—and mother to Kimberly, Christina, and Anthony—she  sells dresses and, along with her daughters, designs custom gowns for clients.
Kimberly "Kim" Gambale -- The oldest daughter, Kimberly helps manage the dress shop with her mother. Kimberly is co-creator of Diane & Co.’s Fluff Me Service, which provides "day of" pampering to clients at their special events. Kimberly is married and has 2 children(a daughter and a son).
Christina "Chrissy" Scali -- The middle child, Christina is fresh from leaving her parents’ home. Testing the boundaries as a single woman in New Jersey, Christina’s love life is always a topic of conversation in the shop.
Anthony Scali -- The youngest Scali, works as a DJ in a party planning business, Scali Entertainment. Anthony often offers advice and  light-hearted teasing.
Sal Scali -- Diane's husband. Along with Anthony, Sal provides a sounding board for the other staff members.
Mac Duggal -- One of the shop's main dress suppliers whose store they visit in Chicago.

Episodes

Season 1 (2010)

Season 2 (2012)

References

External links

2010 American television series debuts
English-language television shows
Oxygen (TV channel) original programming
Television shows set in New Jersey
Television shows filmed in New Jersey